Darul Uloom Zakariyya (translated as,  Zakariyya International Islamic University) is an Islamic university in Lenasia,  South Africa with an international student population. Opened in 1983 in an agricultural area, it is now surrounded by the suburb of Zakariyya Park, which is named in its honor. Since its inception, the Darul Uloom Zakariyya has expanded, to now include a branch in Eikenhof – opened in 2000 – and a Maktab in Mandane – Soweto. The institute has gained widespread reputation due to the exemplary altruistic and spiritual philanthropy exercised by its alumni.

Faculty of Studies
The Darul Uloom Zakariyya has five faculties of Study:
 Hifdhul-Qur'an – The Memorization of the Qur'an al-Kareem
 Aalimiyah – Study of Islamic Jurisprudence and Sciences (Maulana / Islamic Scholar)
 Tajweed and Qira’aat – Science of Qur'anic Phonetics and Renditions (Sabah and Asharah): This was initiated in 1988.
 Ifta course – Specialization in the Science of Islamic Jurisprudence and Research (Mufti): It has been active since 1987 under the supervision of Mufti Radha al-Haqq. A formal Darul Ifta was then established in 1992.
 Arabic Adab – Specialization in Arabic Literature

Notable alumni

 Mufti Abdur Rahman ibn Yusuf Mangera
 Moavia Azam Tariq

References

External links
duz.co.za – Official website
Youtube.com – YouTube video showing a Hafiz graduation gathering

Islamic universities and colleges
Deobandi Islamic universities and colleges